Alfred Darbyshire (20 June 1839 – 5 July 1908) was a British architect.

Education and career

Alfred Darbyshire was born on 20 June 1839 in Salford, Lancashire, to William Darbyshire, the manager of a dyeworks, and his wife Mary née Bancroft. He was a nephew of George Bradshaw, the compiler of railway guides. His education began at the Quaker school in Manchester and continued from 1852 at the Quaker Ackworth School where his artistic abilities were recognised and encouraged by Henry Sparkes. He completed his education at Lindow Grove Academy, Alderley.

On leaving school he was articled to P. B. Alley of the architects' firm of Lane and Alley in Manchester and enrolled in  the Manchester School of Art. In 1862 he established his own architectural practice at St James's Square, Manchester. Early commissions included additions to Lyme Hall and a house in Newton-le-Willows. He was one of the founders of the first Manchester Architectural Association.

Frederick Bennett Smith joined him as a partner from about 1885 to 1905. Darbyshire died in Manchester in 1908 and was buried at Flixton Church.

Works

Darbyshire admired the Gothic Revival style of Alfred Waterhouse but also designed in the neoclassical style. He is best known for his theatrical architecture. He designed Manchester's Gaiety Theatre and a theatre at Rawtenstall, and carried out alterations at Manchester's Theatre Royal and the Prince's theatres. In London he altered and decorated the Lyceum Theatre. 

Concerned by the danger of fire in theatres, he worked with the actor Henry Irving to develop the Irving-Darbyshire safety plan which consisted of isolating separate parts of the theatre and providing fireproof escape routes. He first implemented this plan when he rebuilt the Theatre Royal, Exeter which had been destroyed in the Exeter Theatre Royal fire in 1887, killing 186 people. His last major theatre was the Palace of Varieties in Manchester.

Other buildings designed by Darbyshire include Pendleton Town Hall, Manchester Corporation Abattoir, Alston Hall in Lancashire, the Carnegie Library in Knutsford and the churches of St Cyprian and St Ignatius in Salford. He made designs for temporary exhibitions, including a military bazaar in Manchester in 1884, a Shakespearean show in the Royal Albert Hall the same year and in the Royal Jubilee Exhibition in Manchester in 1887.

Darbyshire was also involved in the design of several distilleries and factories for the Jameson family and was later engaged by Andrew Jameson to design a Tudor revival style mansion house for the family on Howth Head in the Northern suburbs of Dublin called Sutton House.

Theatre
 Alfred Darbyshire was a man of many talents which centred on the theatre. As well as building them, he acted in them and became famous for his extravagant stage productions.

In 1869 Charles Calvert, actor-manager of the Prince's Theatre, Manchester, employed Alfred to redecorate the theatre. They became good friends and Alfred assisted Calvert with the staging of some of his great 'revivals' of Shakespeare's plays.

In 1872 he built a spectacular set for the triumphal entry of the King into London in Henry V. He reproduced the streets of London, the seaport of Southampton, the walled town of Harfleur, the battle field of Agincourt, the palaces of Westminster and Rouen, and the cathedral of Troyes. It contained between two and three hundred persons. The production was carried through the United States and into Australia. In New York more than 100,000 people visited Booth's Theatre to see the play.

Paintings

As a landscape painter he sketched and painted in Italy, France, Belgium and Germany. He was friendly with Dante Gabriel Rossetti, Ford Madox Brown and Walter Crane. Alfred could produce an intricate architectural watercolour depicting Durham Cathedral, or a busy colourful picture of a harbour in Whitby, now both in Stockport Art Gallery.

Writing
He was an art critic for the Manchester Guardian from 1868 to 1874 and thereafter until 1905 he was an art critic for the Manchester Courier. He wrote a number of books on architecture, heraldry and art – including A Booke of Olde Manchester and Salford containing about 70 illustrations of ancient buildings, which he compiled for the Jubilee celebrations of 1887.

He published a volume The Art of the Victorian Stage, and innumerable pamphlets and brochures for such occasions as the Old Manchester and Salford Exhibition. He also wrote an autobiography.

Publications
A Booke of Olde Manchester and Salford (1887)
A Chronicle of the Brasenose Club, Manchester (in two volumes, 1892–1900)
An Architect's Experiences: Professional, Artistic and Theatrical (1897)
The Art of the Victorian Stage (1907)

Personal life
In 1870 he married Sarah Marshall with whom he had a son and three daughters. Darbyshire was an amateur actor and a friend of many actors, in particular Charles Calvert and Henry Irving. He continued to be a member of the Society of Friends. He became a fellow of the Institute of British Architects in 1870 and was its vice-president from 1902 to 1905. He was president of the Manchester Society of Architects from 1901 to 1903. He collected books on heraldry and these are now in the John Rylands Library, Manchester.

Alfred lectured to many societies. He was a member of the Manchester Academy of Fine Arts (1867,) Manchester Arts Club (1870,) the Brasenose Club and a council member for the Lancashire and Cheshire Antiquarian Society. He was cousin to the American industrialists and philanthropists William Poole Bancroft and Samuel Bancroft, the latter of whom corresponded extensively with Darbyshire about artwork.

References

Bibliography
Susan W Thomson, Manchester's Victorian Art Scene And Its Unrecognised Artists, Manchester Art Press,Warrington, 2007. . Chapter 10, Alfred Darbyshire 1839–1908 – Architect, Theatrical Designer and Landscape Painter, p.p 110-119.
Alfred Darbyshire, "An architect's experiences: professional, artistic, and theatrical" (1897) - autobiography

External Resources
 Alfred Darbyshire Papers, University of Manchester Library.

1839 births
1908 deaths
People educated at Ackworth School
Architects from Greater Manchester
People from Salford
Lancashire and Cheshire Antiquarian Society